Palais des sports de Marseille is a multi-purpose arena, located in Marseille, France. The seating capacity of the arena varies, 5,800 people and it was opened in 1988.

Multi-purpose stadiums in France
Sports venues in Marseille
Sports venues completed in 1988